Let's Join Joanie is an unaired TV pilot produced in 1950 at CBS Columbia Square in Hollywood as a proposed live weekly (or bi-weekly) series, based on their radio show Leave It To Joan. Today, it is best remembered for its star, Joan Davis, who would later star in the popular 1952–1955 sitcom I Married Joan.

Episode status
The pilot is currently in the public domain. It was released on Region 1 DVD by Alpha Video on January 29, 2008.

External links
 
 

Television pilots not picked up as a series
Unaired television pilots
Black-and-white American television shows